George J. Furey  (born May 12, 1948) is a Canadian politician who has served as the speaker of the Senate of Canada since December 3, 2015. Furey was appointed as a senator from Newfoundland and Labrador in 1999 and is the longest-serving member of the Senate.

Background 
Furey earned a Bachelor of Arts Degree and a Bachelor of Education Degree from Memorial University in 1970. He also completed a Master of Education Degree from Memorial in 1976. After graduating, he worked as a teacher for the Roman Catholic School Board in St. John's from 1969 to 1972. From 1972 to 1978, Furey was a supervising vice principal with the Port-au-Port Roman Catholic School Board, and from 1978 to 1980 supervising principal of the Placentia-St. Mary's Roman Catholic School Board.

After a career in education, he went on to earn a law degree from Dalhousie University in 1983. He was called to the Newfoundland Bar in 1984. Furey was later named a partner at the St. John's law firm of O'Brien, Furey & Hurley. By 1989, he was a senior partner at the law firm of O'Brien, Furey & Smith. He was appointed as Queen's Counsel in 1996.

Furey volunteers for volunteer groups, professional boards, and provincial commissions, including the Newfoundland Teachers' Association, Scouts Canada, the St. Clare's Mercy Hospital Ethics Committee, the Gonzaga High School Council, and the Provincial Police Complaints Commission.

In 2020, Furey's son Andrew announced his candidacy for leader of the Liberal Party of Newfoundland and Labrador and was elected leader in August 2020, becoming the 14th Premier of Newfoundland and Labrador.

Political career 
Furey was named to the Senate of Canada by Prime Minister Jean Chrétien on August 11, 1999. As a senator, he has been a member of several Senate committees and has served as Chair of the Standing Committee on Internal Economy, Budgets and Administration and the Standing Committee on Legal and Constitutional Affairs.

On January 29, 2014, Liberal Party leader Justin Trudeau announced that the party's caucus in the Senate would be dissolved. Some former Liberals, including Furey, would maintain a caucus, styled the Senate Liberal Caucus, but with no formal affiliation with the main Liberal Party.

Speaker of the Senate 
On December 3, 2015, Furey was appointed Speaker of the Senate by Prime Minister Justin Trudeau replacing Senator Leo Housakos. He resigned from the Senate Liberal Caucus upon assuming the speaker's chair.

As Speaker, Furey presides over a period of Senate reform. In his opening address, he highlighted a need for the Senate to reinvent itself and to fulfil its role, as intended by the Constitution, as an independent institution "of sober second thought".

References 

1948 births
Canadian King's Counsel
Speakers of the Senate of Canada
Canadian senators from Newfoundland and Labrador
Liberal Party of Canada senators
Living people
Independent Canadian senators
Politicians from St. John's, Newfoundland and Labrador
Memorial University of Newfoundland alumni
Schulich School of Law alumni
21st-century Canadian politicians